Here follows a list of notable alumni of Purdue University.

Notable alumni

Academia

College chancellors, presidents and vice-presidents
 Robert Altenkirch – former President of the New Jersey Institute of Technology and University of Alabama in Huntsville
 Tony Frank – President, Colorado State University
 Domenico Grasso – Chancellor, University of Michigan-Dearborn
 Richard J. Grosh – former President of Rensselaer Polytechnic Institute
 Arthur G. Hansen – former President of the Georgia Institute of Technology and Purdue University
 Edwin D. Harrison – former President of the Georgia Institute of Technology
 Renu Khator – Chancellor of the University of Houston System and President of the University of Houston
 Dorothy Leland – President, Georgia College & State University
 Duane Litfin – President, Wheaton College
 Sally Mason – President of the University of Iowa, former Provost of Purdue University
 Hanna Nasser – former President of Birzeit University, political figure
 Sunder Ramaswamy – President of the Monterey Institute of International Studies
 Kenneth "Buzz" Shaw – Chancellor of Syracuse University
 Gary Allan Sojka – President of Bucknell University
 Hugo F. Sonnenschein – economist and educational administrator, President of the University of Chicago
 James J. Stukel – former President of the University of Illinois
 Blake Ragsdale Van Leer – former President of the Georgia Institute of Technology
 Larry N. Vanderhoef – Chancellor of the University of California, Davis
 Brent W. Webb – academic vice president of Brigham Young University
 John T. Wolfe Jr. – former President of Savannah State University
 Stephen Standifird - President of Bradley University

Deans
 Srinivas Aravamudan – Dean of the Humanities, Duke University
 Arthur J. Bond – Dean of the School of Engineering and Technology at Alabama A&M University and civil rights activist
 Paul Weber – Dean of Faculties and interim president of the Georgia Institute of Technology

Professors
 Nolan B. Aughenbaugh – Antarctic explorer and Professor Emeritus of Geological Engineering at the University of Mississippi
 James R. Barker – professor of Organizational Theory and Strategy, Waikato University
 Michael Baye – Bert Elwert Professor of Business Economics, Indiana University
 L. W. Beineke – professor of graph theory at Indiana University – Purdue University Fort Wayne
 Ronald A. Bosco – expert on Ralph Waldo Emerson, Puritan homiletics and poetics
 Robert Owen Hutchins – professor organic chemistry at Drexel University 
 Ann E. Hagerman – professor of biochemistry at University of Miami
 Ronald Breaker – Henry Ford II Professor of Molecular, Cellular, and Developmental Biology at Yale University
 Monty Buell – chair of the Department of History and Philosophy at Walla Walla University
 George Casella – statistician at Rutgers University, Cornell University, and the University of Florida
 James Samuel Coleman – author of the Coleman Report on the sociology of education
 Carl W. Condit – architectural historian, Northwestern University
 Clarence Cory – the first Professor in Mechanical and Electrical Engineering at UC Berkeley; received BME degree from Purdue University in 1889 at the age of 16 and a Doctor of Engineering degree from Purdue University in 1914
 Bruce E. Dale – Professor of Chemical Engineering, Michigan State University
 Kenneth E. deGraffenreid – Professor of Intelligence Studies, Institute of World Politics
 Victor Denenberg – developmental psychobiologist
 Ralph Faudree – mathematician, combinatorialist, provost at University of Memphis
 James Fieser – professor of philosophy at the University of Tennessee at Martin
 Allan Friedman – Guy L. Odom Professor of Neurological Surgery at Duke University Medical Center
 Kevin Granata – Adjunct Professor, Department of Engineering Science and Mechanics and Mechanical Engineering at Virginia Tech; victim of the Virginia Tech massacre
 Michael T. Goodrich – mathematician, computer scientist, department chair at the University of California, Irvine
 Larry Howell – professor of mechanical engineering, Brigham Young University
 Peter C. Hu - professor molecular genetic technology, The University of Texas MD Anderson Cancer Center, Houston
 Roger G. Ibbotson – professor of finance, Yale School of Management
 Richard Ian Kimball – professor of history, Brigham Young University
 Benn Konsynski – Goizueta Business School, Emory University
 Lawrence Landweber – John P. Morgridge Professor Emeritus of Computer Science at the University of Wisconsin–Madison
 Arthur H. Lefebvre – professor; Head of the Department of Mechanical Engineering between 1976–1993; pioneer of gas turbine technology and developer of fuel spray technology; professor at Cranfield University, UK
 G. V. Loganathan – Professor, Department of Civil and Environmental Engineering at Virginia Tech; victim of the Virginia Tech massacre
Fred Mannering – Professor, College of Engineering, University of South Florida 
 Donald Matthews – political scientist, University of Washington
 James McDonald – economist at Brigham Young University
 Deborah E. McDowell – English professor and author
 Scott A. McLuckey – John A. Leighty Distinguished Professor of Chemistry at Purdue University
 Dorothy Runk Mennen – theatre professor, author and Founding president of the Voice and Speech Trainers Association.
 Gary Milhollin – law professor, anti–nuclear weapons activist
 William F. Miller – vice president and provost, Stanford University
 William E. Moore – chemistry professor and vice chancellor for academic affairs at Southern University; Moore was the first Black PhD in chemistry to graduate from Purdue 
 Toby Moskowitz – financial economist, University of Chicago
 David Mount – computer scientist, University of Maryland
 J. Keith Murnighan – Harold H. Hines Jr. Distinguished Professor of Risk Management at the Kellogg School of Management, Northwestern University
 Donna J. Nelson – chemistry professor; Nelson Diversity Surveys author, scientific workforce scholar (Postdoctorate 1980–1983)
 Robert W. Newcomb – professor of electrical engineering at the University of Maryland
 Dallin D. Oaks – linguistics professor at Brigham Young University
 Peter N. Peregrine – anthropologist and archaeologist
 Larry L. Peterson – computer scientist at Princeton University
 Ronald L. Phillips – biologist, University of Minnesota
 T. Pradeep – Professor of Chemistry, Indian Institute of Technology Madras, Chennai, India
 Steven Pray – Bernhardt Professor of Nonprescription Products and Devices at Southwestern Oklahoma State University
 John C. Reynolds – computer scientist
 Sherwin Rosen – labor economist
 Lyle F. Schoenfeldt – business management professor, known for a standard textbook on human resources
 Granville Sewell – mathematician and intelligent design advocate
 Thomas B. Sheridan – Professor of Mechanical engineering at the Massachusetts Institute of Technology, pioneer of robotics and remote control technology
 Carolyn Sherif – social psychologist
 Stephen C. Smith PhD – Sociology professor and researcher. Also practicing family therapist
 Murray Sperber – Professor Emeritus of English and American Studies at Indiana University, author of several books on college sports
 Yizhi Jane Tao – Rice University biochemist who mapped the structure of the influenza A virus nucleoprotein to an atomic level
 James Tour – synthetic organic chemist and nanotechnologist at Rice University
 Ralph von Frese – geophysicist who identified the Wilkes Land mass concentration in Antarctica
 Gregory Weeks – international relations scholar at Webster University Vienna
 Jill Zimmerman – computer scientist and the James M. Beall Professor of Mathematics and Computer Science at Goucher College
 John W. Sutherland – Professor and Fehsenfeld Family Head of Environmental and Ecological Engineering (EEE), Purdue University

Science and technology

Astronauts and aviators
 Neil Armstrong – Gemini 8, Apollo 11; first man to walk on the Moon
 John Blaha – STS-29, STS-33, STS-43, STS-58, STS-79, STS-81
 Roy D. Bridges – STS-51-F
 Mark N. Brown – STS-28, STS-48
 John H. Casper – STS-36, STS-54, STS-62, STS-77
 Eugene Cernan – Gemini 9A, Apollo 10, Apollo 17; most recent man to walk on the Moon
 Roger Chaffee – killed in Apollo 1 accident
 Richard O. Covey – STS-51-I, STS-26, STS-38, STS-61
 Andrew J. Feustel – STS-125, STS-134
 Guy S. Gardner – STS-27, STS-35
 Henry C. Gordon – Air Force colonel selected for Boeing X-20 Dyna-Soar program
 Virgil I. Grissom – second American in space, Gemini 3, killed in Apollo 1 accident
 Guy Gruters – fighter pilot and prisoner of war in the Vietnam War
 Gregory J. Harbaugh – STS-39, STS-54, STS-71, STS-82
 Iven Carl Kincheloe Jr. – flying ace of the Korean War, first pilot to fly above 100,000 feet (30,480 m)
 Michael J. McCulley – STS-34
 Loral O'Hara – NASA astronaut selected in 2017
 Gary E. Payton – STS-51-C
 Mark L. Polansky – STS-98, STS-116, STS-127
 Jerry L. Ross – STS-61-B, STS-27, STS-37, STS-55, STS-74, STS-88, STS-110; holds the US record for spaceflights
 Karl Schoen – one of the first U.S. flying aces of World War I
 Loren J. Shriver – STS-51-C, STS-31, STS-46
 Chesley "Sully" Sullenberger – pilot of US Airways flight 1549 which successfully ditched in the Hudson River
 Scott D. Tingle – Soyuz MS-07
 Janice E. Voss – STS-57, STS-63, STS-83, STS-94, STS-99
 Charles D. Walker – STS-41-D, STS-51-D, STS-61-B
 Mary E. Weber – STS-70, STS-101
 George Welch – World War II fighter pilot and test pilot; best known for shooting down four Japanese planes during the attack on Pearl Harbor
 Donald E. Williams – STS-51-D, STS-34
 David A. Wolf – STS-58, STS-86, Mir 24, STS-89, STS-112, STS-127

Engineers
 Mohamed Atalla – Distinguished Engineering Alumnus, inventor of MOSFET (metal–oxide–semiconductor field-effect transistor), pioneer in silicon semiconductors and security systems, founder of Atalla Corporation
 Stephen Bechtel Jr. – Chairman emeritus of Bechtel Group
 Don R. Berlin – chief designer of several military aircraft of World War II
Afua Bruce – Executive Director of the National Science and Technology Council in the Office of Science Technology and Policy at the White House, Chief Program Officer at DataKind
 Orestes H. Caldwell – one of the first five members of the Federal Radio Commission
 Abraham Burton Cohen – civil engineer notable for designing record-breaking concrete bridges such as the Tunkhannock Viaduct
 John P. Costas – electrical engineer, inventor of the Costas loop and the Costas array
 Wayne Hale – NASA engineer
Mamoon Hamid – Managing Member and General Partner at Kleiner Perkins
Richard E. Hayden – acoustics engineer, won the Wright Brothers Medal in 1973 for a research paper on noise reduction for STOL aircraft
 John H. McMasters – aeronautical engineer
 John Joseph Martin – mechanical engineer, author of Atmospheric Entry
Elwood Mead – Commissioner of the Bureau of Reclamation for construction of Grand Coulee, Hoover and Owyhee Dams; namesake of Lake Mead.
 Benjamin Franklin Miessner – engineer and inventor (did not graduate)
 David P. Niesse - Civil Engineer 
 Daniel Raymer – aerospace engineer
 Henry Sampson – inventor and nuclear engineer
 Malcolm Slaney – American Electrical Engineer and Research Scientist at Google
 Games Slayter – chemical engineer, inventor of fiberglass

Researchers
 Fernley H. Banbury – inventor of the Banbury mixer in 1916
 Robert C. Baker – inventor of the chicken nugget
 Myron L. Bender – biochemist, recipient of the Midwest Award of the American Chemical Society
 Seymour Benzer – physicist and biologist, winner of the Wolf Prize in Medicine in 1991
 Henry Luke Bolley – botanist, plant pathologist, and football coach
 Richard Bootzin – clinical and research psychologist
 Robert D. Cess – atmospheric scientist
 Rita R. Colwell – environmental microbiologist and scientific administrator; Director of National Science Foundation
 Ward Cunningham – inventor of the wiki concept
 Harry Daghlian – physics, the first peacetime fatality of nuclear fission
 Joel Emer – microprocessor architect and Intel Fellow
 Dan Farmer – computer security researcher
 Martin Feinberg – mathematician and chemical engineer
 Elizabeth J. Feinler – information scientist and Internet pioneer
 Gloria Niemeyer Francke – pharmacist and science writer
 William H. Gerstenmaier – associate administrator at NASA
 Norman E. Gibbs – software engineering researcher
 Millicent Goldschmidt – microbiologist and 2006 "Outstanding Alumni", Purdue Department of Biological Sciences
 Jonathan Grudin – researcher of human–computer interaction and computer-supported cooperative work
 Kun-Liang Guan – biochemist
 Clarence Hansell – research engineer who pioneered investigation into the biological effects of ionized air
 Obed Crosby Haycock – researcher of the upper atmosphere
 Jesse E. Hobson – director of SRI International
 Deng Jiaxian – physicist, "father of the Chinese A-bomb"
 Bradford Keeney – psychotherapist, ethnographer, cybernetician
 Gerhard Klimeck – nanotechnologist
 Harry Kloor – physicist, chemist, screenwriter
 Bertram Kostant – mathematician
 Markus Kuhn – computer scientist
 Matthew Luckiesh – "Father of the Science of Seeing"
 Robert W. Lucky – electrical engineer, inventor, and research manager
 Andrew Majda – ISI highly cited researcher in mathematics
 Herbert Newby McCoy – chemist
 Elwood Mead – former Head, Bureau of Reclamation; oversaw the construction of Hoover Dam
 Marilyn T. Miller – pediatric ophthalmologist
 Ben Roy Mottelson – Nobel Laureate in Physics in 1975
 Ian Murdock – founder of the Debian Project
 David E. Nichols – pharmacologist, world-renowned expert on psychedelics, founder of the Heffter Institute
 Alex Golden Oblad – chemist and chemical engineer who worked on catalysis
 Edward Mills Purcell – Nobel Laureate in Physics in 1952
 C. N. R. Rao – solid-state and materials chemist
 Malcolm Ross – director of the US Navy manned balloon program Project Strato-Lab; set the current altitude record for manned balloon flight with Victor Prather in 1961
 Yitang Zhang – mathematician known for his work with twin primes 
 Ming-Ming Zhou – structural and chemical biologist
 Farhan Baqai - camera engineer at Apple Inc. and IEEE fellow

Arts and entertainment
 Robert K. Abbett – book-cover illustrator and outdoor painter
 George Ade – humorist
 Ted Allen – Host of 2-time James Beard Award-winning cooking competition Chopped on Food Network; former food and wine connoisseur on the Bravo's Emmy-winning television program Queer Eye; Esquire magazine writer, author and TV host
 Max Armstrong – agriculture broadcaster in Chicago
 Donald Bain – author and ghostwriter (Murder, She Wrote, Coffee, Tea or Me)
 Karen Black – actress
 Monte Blue – actor of the silent film era, later a character actor
 Millie Bobby Brown - actor, known for her role in the television series Stranger Things as well as in the Enola Holmes films. 
 Jack Cashill – author, journalist, blogger, contributor to WorldNetDaily
 Kenneth Choi – actor, known for his role as Jim Morita in Captain America: The First Avenger, also Red Dawn and sitcoms
 Kate Collins – author (Flower Shop Mysteries)
 Trevor Collins – Manager at Achievement Hunter
 Thomas James De la Hunt – Indiana historian and columnist
 Eric Dill – musician, member of the band The Click Five
 Simone Elkeles – young-adult romance writer
 Dick Florea – television personality in Fort Wayne, Indiana
 William R. Forstchen – novelist
 Jim Gaffigan – comedian and actor
 JoAnn Giordano – textile artist
 Mass Giorgini – punk rock producer of bands such as Rise Against and Anti-Flag and bassist for Screeching Weasel and Squirtgun
 Gerald Jay Goldberg – novelist
 Harold Gray – creator of Little Orphan Annie comic strip
 Jeff Grubb – author and game designer
 Gabriel Gudding – essayist and poet
 Moira Gunn – host of National Public Radio programs Tech Nation and BioTech Nation
 John Guzlowski – author
 Jack Horkheimer – host of astronomy television program Jack Horkheimer: Star Gazer
 Steve Horton – New York Times bestselling graphic novelist
 Rick Karr – journalist
 Callie Khouri – screenwriter, director, and film producer
 Jane King – business journalist
 Michael King – political commentator, columnist, television producer
 Harry Kloor – screenwriter, physicist, chemist
 Mercedes Lackey – fantasy novelist
 Wayne Lamb – Broadway and television dancer and Professor Emeritus of Theatre
 John T. McCutcheon – cartoonist, recipient of a Pulitzer Prize in 1931
 Delita Martin – printmaker and mixed media artist
 Hoshang Merchant – poet
 Felicia Middlebrooks – radio news broadcaster
 Gavin Mikhail – pianist, singer-songwriter
 Karen Marie Moning – novelist
 Tom Moore – theater director
 Carrie Newcomer – singer and songwriter
 Clifton Nicholson – sculptor and jewelry designer
 Mark O'Hare – writer and cartoonist who has worked on various Nickelodeon and Cartoon Network programs
 Bree Olsen – adult film actress
 Chubby Parker – folk musician
 George Peppard (attended) – actor
 Bob Peterson – animator, screenwriter, director and voice actor at Pixar
 Julian Phillips – Emmy Award winner, co-host of weekend Fox & Friends, Fox TV
 Carol Plum-Ucci – young-adult novelist and essayist
 Pat Proctor – war game developer, U.S. Army lieutenant colonel
 Bruce Rogers – typographer, inventor of the Centaur typeface
 Dulquer Salmaan – Indian Actor, appeared in Malayalam, Tamil, Telugu and Hindi language movies.
 Peter Schneider - film executive, The Walt Disney Company
 Dave Schulthise – punk rock bass guitarist for the Dead Milkmen
 Gary Mark Smith – artist, author, master global street photographer
 Richard Sprague – author and researcher of the John F. Kennedy assassination
 Martha Hopkins Struever – dealer and scholar of American Indian art
 Elizabeth Stuckey-French – short story writer and novelist
 Booth Tarkington – novelist
 Stephanie S. Tolan – children's book author
 Martin Walls – poet
 Don West – pitchman, television personality, wrestling broadcaster
 Perry Wilson - Movie Critic, thecinemapsycho.com
 Lebbeus Woods – artist and architect

Business and industry
 Karan Adani – CEO of Adani Ports & SEZ 
 Samuel R. Allen – CEO of John Deere
 Chuck Armstrong – president of the Seattle Mariners
 Joyce Beber – advertising executive, promoter of hotelier Leona Helmsley
 Stephen Bechtel Jr. – chairman emeritus and director of Bechtel Group, Inc.
 Paul Bevilaqua – chief engineer, Advanced Development Projects, Lockheed Martin Skunk Works
 Gordon Binder – former CEO of Amgen (1988–2000).
 Michael Birck – chairman and founder of Tellabs, Inc.
 Charles F. Bowman – co-founder of Orville Redenbacher's Gourmet Popping Corn
 Beth Brooke – global vice chair of Public Policy for Ernst & Young
 Susan Bulkeley Butler – first female partner at Accenture; author of Become the CEO of You, Inc.
 Herman Cain (MS '71) – businessman, politician, and columnist; former chairman and CEO of Godfather's Pizza
 James Cash Jr. – member of the boards of directors at General Electric, Microsoft, and Walmart
 JoMei Chang – co-founder of Tibco Software
 Allen Chao – co-founder of Watson Pharmaceuticals
 Richard E. Dauch – co-founder of American Axle & Manufacturing
 Rodger Dean Duncan – author and business consultant
 Michael L. Eskew – chairman and CEO, UPS
 Gen Fukunaga – president of FUNimation
 Greg Hayes (1982) – CEO and chair of United Technologies; Business Roundtable member
 Gerald D. Hines (BSME 1948) – real estate developer and principal of Hines
 John R. Horne (BS 1960) – former CEO of Navistar
 Brian Lamb – co-founder, chairman, and CEO of C-SPAN
 Howard Lance – CEO of Maxar Technologies
 Marshall Larsen – former chairman, president, and CEO of Goodrich Corporation
 Cook Lougheed – entrepreneur and philanthropist
 Bala S. Manian – medical technology entrepreneur
 Preston McAfee – economist at Google
 Steven McGeady – former Intel executive
 Wade Miquelon – executive vice president and chief financial officer for Walgreens
 Herman H. Pevler – former president of the Norfolk and Western Railway and of the Wabash Railroad
 Patricia Kessler Poppe – president & CEO, CMS and Consumers Energy
 Orville Redenbacher – business leader and agriculturalist; co-founder of Orville Redenbacher's popcorn
 Donald Rice – CEO of Agensys and board member of Wells Fargo Bank
 Lee Schmidt – golf course architect, co-founder of Lee-Schmidt Design, Inc.
 Edmund Schweitzer – president of Schweitzer Engineering Laboratories
 Ruth Siems – home economist with General Foods, inventor of Stovetop Stuffing
 Venu Srinivasan – chairman of TVS Motor
 Don Thompson – CEO of McDonald's
 James A. Thomson – president and CEO, Rand Corporation
 Gregory Wasson – president and chief operating officer, Walgreens corporation
 Sanjiva Weerawarana – co-founder, chairman and CEO of WSO2

Government and law

National office
 Akinwumi Adesina – President of the African Development Bank
 Rashid al-Rifai – ambassador and government minister in Iraq
Joseph Kingsley Baffour-Senkyire, Ghanaian academic, politician and diplomat; member of parliament in the first republic of Ghana and formerly Ghana's ambassador to the United States of America
Jim Baird – U.S. Representative from Indiana's 4th district (R)
 Donald W. Banner – former U.S. Commissioner of Patents and Trademarks 
 Joe L. Barton – U.S. Representative from 6th District of Texas (R)
 Birch Bayh – former United States Senator from Indiana (D)
 Earl L. Butz – former Secretary of the United States Department of Agriculture (R)
 Chang Chia-juch – former Minister of Economic Affairs of Taiwan
 Bob Charles – former member of the Australian House of Representatives
 Mark Chen – former Secretary-General and former Minister of Foreign Affairs of Taiwan
 Curt Clawson – U.S. Representative from Florida's 19th congressional district (R)
 Chuck Conner – Acting Secretary of the United States Department of Agriculture
 Margaret E. Curran – United States Attorney for Rhode Island
 Harry Allison Estep – Republican member of the U.S. House of Representatives from Pennsylvania (R)
 Fahmi Fadzil – member of Malaysian House of Representatives and Minister of Communications and Digital
 Mauricio Fernández Garza – former Mayor of San Pedro Garza García (1989–1991) and former Mexican Senator from Nuevo León (1994–2000)
 Gary A. Grappo – U.S. Ambassador to Oman
 John H. Hager – Lieutenant Governor of Virginia, U.S. Assistant Secretary of Education (R)
 Keith Hall – former Commissioner of the U.S. Bureau of Labor Statistics
 Clifford M. Hardin – former Secretary of the United States Department of Agriculture (R)
 Ralph Harvey – U.S. Representative from Indiana (R)
 Adnan Kahveci – Turkish Minister of State and Minister of Finance, founding member of the Motherland Party
 Keith J. Krach – former U.S. Under Secretary of State; Chairman/CEO of DocuSign and Ariba; Chairman of Purdue Board of Trustees
 Suwat Liptapanlop – government minister in Thailand
 David McKinley – U.S. Representative for West Virginia (R)
 Ted McKinney - U.S. Under Secretary, Trade & Foreign Agricultural Affairs, USDA; CEO of National Association of State Departments of Agriculture-NASDA
 Anthony W. Miller – United States Deputy Secretary of Education
 Marwan Muasher – Deputy Prime Minister, Hashemite Kingdom of Jordan
 Essam Sharaf – former Prime Minister of Egypt
 Ann Stock – U.S. Assistant Secretary of State for Educational and Cultural Affairs
 Kevin Sullivan – White House Communications Director
 Claude R. Wickard – former U.S. Secretary of Agriculture
 Richard Llewellyn Williams – first U.S. Ambassador to Mongolia
 Muhammad Lutfi, Indonesian diplomat, businessman, trade minister , ambassador to Japan, ambassador to the United States of America

Military
 Terry M. Cross – former Vice Commandant of the United States Coast Guard
 Nelson F. Gibbs – U.S. Assistant Secretary of the Air Force
 Sun Liren – Chinese Nationalist General who excelled in the Burma Campaign during World War II
 Carter B. Magruder – four-star General, U.S. Army
 Glen W. Martin – Inspector General of the U.S. Air Force
 B. J. Penn – former Assistant Secretary of the U.S. Navy
 Carol M. Pottenger – Vice Admiral, U.S. Navy
 Jerald D. Slack – U.S. Air National Guard Major General, Adjutant General of Wisconsin
 Carol I. Turner – former Chief of the United States Navy Dental Corps
 James C. Van Sice – former Superintendent of the U.S. Coast Guard Academy
 Russell R. Waesche – Commandant of the U.S. Coast Guard during World War II
 Fahmi Fadzil – Member of Parliaments in Malaysia

Sub-national office
 Ron Alting – Indiana State Senator (R)
 Brian Bosma – Speaker of the Indiana General Assembly
 Robert J. Burkhardt – former Secretary of State of New Jersey (D)
 Suzanne Crouch – 52nd Lieutenant Governor of Indiana (R)
 Sue Ellspermann – Lieutenant Governor of Indiana (R)
 Kirk Fordice – former Governor of Mississippi (R)
 Kent Gaffney – former member of the Illinois House of Representatives (R)
 Jerry E. Hinshaw (Class of 1940) – former member of the Arkansas House of Representatives (R)
 Matt Hostettler – member of the Indiana House of Representatives (R)
 Ralph S. Johnson (Class of 1930) – aviator; former member of the Wyoming House of Representatives (R)
 Delores G. Kelley – Maryland State Senator (D)
 Sheila Klinker – member of the Indiana House of Representatives (D)
 J. Tom Lendrum – member of the Ohio House of Representatives (R)
 Harry G. Leslie – former Governor of Indiana (R)
 Alan Olsen – Oregon State Senator (R)
 Paul Parks – Massachusetts Secretary of Education (D)
 Zach Payne – member of the Indiana House of Representatives
 Scott Reske – member of the Indiana House of Representatives (D)
 Darlene Senger – member of the Illinois House of Representatives (R)
 Wayne Townsend – member of both houses of the Indiana legislature and the Democratic candidate for governor in 1984 (D)
 Frank Watson – member of the Illinois Senate (R)

Local office
 Isaac Colton Ash – Los Angeles, California, City Council member
 Jane Baker – first female mayor of San Mateo, California
 John J. Barton – former mayor of Indianapolis, Indiana (D)
 Marty Blum – former mayor of Santa Barbara, California
 Elgin English Crull – longest serving city manager of Dallas, Texas to date (1952 to 1966); was city manager when John F. Kennedy was assassinated
 A.E. Henning – Los Angeles, California, City Council member, 1929–33
 Robert J. LaFortune, former mayor of Tulsa, Oklahoma
 Bart Peterson – former mayor of Indianapolis, Indiana (D)
 David H. Rodgers – former mayor of Spokane, Washington (R)

Other political and legal figures
 Nels Ackerson – lawyer, 2008 candidate for U.S. Congress from Indiana (D)
 Allen Alley – Oregon Republican Party chairman
 Roberto Feliberti Cintrón - Associate Justice of the Supreme Court of Puerto Rico
 Uthum Herat – Deputy Governor of the Central Bank of Sri Lanka and Alternate Executive Director of the International Monetary Fund.
 Jeffrey M. Lacker – president of Federal Reserve Bank of Richmond
 Fred Meyer (Class of 1949) – state chairman of the Texas Republican Party, 1988 to 1994; Dallas businessman
 Marilyn Quayle – lawyer, novelist, and political figure, wife of former U.S. Vice President Dan Quayle
 Charles Mok – Hong Kong Legislative Council member
 Ram Mohan Naidu - Member of Parliament

Sports

Baseball

 Bernie Allen – 12-year career infielder with the Minnesota Twins, Washington Senators, New York Yankees and Montreal Expos; also played for the Boilermakers
 Jermaine Allensworth – former Major League Baseball player
 Roger Bossard – head groundskeeper for the Chicago White Sox, sports turf consultant for MLB, NFL, Major League Soccer
 Jay Buente – relief pitcher for the Florida Marlins
 Michael Duursma – shortstop for the Netherlands national baseball team
 Bob Friend – former MLB pitcher; 4-time All-Star, World Series Champion
 Josh Lindblom – relief pitcher for the Philadelphia Phillies
 Joe McCabe – former Major League baseball player
 Cameron Perkins – infielder for the Philadelphia Phillies
 Kevin Plawecki – catcher for the Boston Red Sox
 Moose Skowron – former Major League Baseball player; 6-time All-Star, 5-time World Series Champion
 Nick Wittgren – Relief Pitcher for the Miami Marlins

Basketball

 Brian Cardinal – NBA Champion Dallas Mavericks, former professional NBA basketball player from 2000–2012
 Joe Barry Carroll – NCAA Final Four 1980, former NBA basketball player, 1st pick overall in NBA Draft (1980)
 Terry Dischinger – former NBA basketball player, (1962–73) NBA Rookie of the Year; Olympic Gold in basketball (1960)
 Katie Douglas – basketball player in the WNBA
 Ray Eddy – former Purdue Boilermakers men's basketball head coach
 Carsen Edwards – NBA player Boston Celtics, twice named an All-American
 Herm Gilliam – NBA Champion Portland Trail Blazers, NBA player (1969-77), NCAA Finals 1969
 Paul Hoffman – former NBA player, BAA Rookie of the Year (1947), NBA Champion (1948), former general manager for the Baltimore Bullets
 Robbie Hummel – 1st Team All-Big Ten; professional basketball player for the Minnesota Timberwolves
 JaJuan Johnson – Big-Ten Player of the Year; current professional basketball for the Idaho Stampede of the NBA Development League
 Carl Landry – 1st Team All-Big Ten; current professional NBA player for the Sacramento Kings
 Billy Keller – NCAA Finals 1969, 3-time ABA Champion, former University of Indianapolis men's basketball coach
 Frank Kendrick – former NBA player and NBA Champion (1975), Golden State Warriors
 Alan Major – former head coach of the Charlotte 49ers
 Cuonzo Martin – current head coach of the Missouri Tigers men's basketball
 Brad Miller – former NBA basketball player, two-time NBA All-Star
 E'Twaun Moore – 1st Team All-Big Ten; current professional NBA player for the New Orleans Pelicans
 Rick Mount – three-time All-American at Purdue and two-time Big Ten Player of the Year; NCAA Finals 1969; former American Basketball Association basketball player
 Matt Painter – current Purdue Boilermakers men's basketball head coach, former coach at Southern Illinois University, 5 NCAA Tournament appearances
 Glenn Robinson – 1994 NCAA Player of the Year (John R. Wooden Award, Naismith Awards and four other polls), two-time 1st Team All-American; former NBA player, 1st pick overall in NBA draft (1994); NBA champion (2005) with San Antonio Spurs
 Amy Ruley – North Dakota State University women's basketball coach
 Dave Schellhase – first-team All-American at Purdue; former Indiana State Sycamores men's basketball head coach, former Minnesota State-Moorhead head coach
 Jerry Sichting – NBA Champion Boston Celtics, NBA player (1980-90), NCAA Final Four 1980
 Kevin Stallings – current Vanderbilt Commodores men's basketball head coach, former coach at Illinois State University
 Biggie Swanigan -- NCAA National Player of the year 2017, NBA first round draft pick, Big Ten Player of the year 2017
 Howie Williams – Olympic Gold in basketball (1952), AAU National Champion (1952, 1953)
 John Wooden – Basketball Hall of Fame honoree as both player and coach; 10-time NCAA Champion coach at UCLA; 1932 National champion and All-American as player

Football

 Mike Alstott – former NFL and Super Bowl Champion fullback for the Tampa Bay Buccaneers, Purdue's all-time leading rusher
 Cliff Avril – NFL defensive end of the Seattle Seahawks; Champion Super Bowl XLVIII and participated in XLIX
 Ryan Baker – NFL defensive end for the Miami Dolphins, 2009–2012
 David Blough – NFL Quarterback for the Detroit Lions
 Drew Brees – Super Bowl Champion, Super Bowl MVP, All-Pro, Pro Bowl quarterback, San Diego Chargers and New Orleans Saints; Maxwell Award; 2 x Heisman Trophy Finalist; Rose Bowl Game
 George Bolan – Chicago Staleys (1921), Bears (1922-24)
 Dave Butz – 16-year, 2x Super Bowl Champion NFL Lineman with the Washington Redskins and selected to the all NFL 1980s Team
 Scott Campbell – played quarterback for six seasons for the Pittsburgh Steelers and Atlanta Falcons
 Rosevelt Colvin – 2x Super Bowl Champion, professional football player in the NFL with the Chicago Bears and New England Patriots
 Gary Danielson – former NFL quarterback; current TV announcer, College Football
 Len Dawson – Pro Football Hall of Fame quarterback with the Kansas City Chiefs, Super Bowl IV MVP
 Jim Everett – Pro Bowl NFL quarterback; Saint Louis Rams, New Orleans Saints, San Diego Chargers
 Tim Foley – Former Defensive Back for Purdue and Defensive Back for Miami Dolphins Super Bowl Champions
 Gilbert Gardner – NFL linebacker, member of the Super Bowl XLI-winning Indianapolis Colts
 Wayne Gift – NFL player with the Cleveland Rams
 Bob Griese – Pro Football Hall of Fame quarterback with the Miami Dolphins; lead Dolphins to 17-0-0 perfect season; 2x Super Bowl Champion quarterback; College Football Hall of Fame, Rose Bowl Champion quarterback
 Steve Griffin – former NFL and Arena Football League player
 Nick Hardwick – former NFL center of the San Diego Chargers
 Matt Hernandez – NFL offensive tackle
 Mark Herrmann – former NFL quarterback with the Indianapolis Colts and San Diego Chargers; 3-time Bowl game MVP with Purdue, Heisman Trophy finalist 
 Paul Humphrey – NFL center for the Brooklyn Dodgers
 Clarence Janecek – NFL offensive guard of the Pittsburgh Pirates
 Dustin Keller – NFL tight end of the Miami Dolphins
 Ryan Kerrigan – NFL linebacker of the Washington Redskins / Football Team and Philadelphia Eagles; 1st Team All-American 
 Ed Klewicki – Detroit Lions, 1930s
 Jon Krick – Arena Football League player
 John Letsinger – Pittsburgh Pirates, 1933
 Matt Light – NFL left tackle of the New England Patriots; 3x Super Bowl Champion Super Bowl (XXXVI, XXXVIII, XXXIX), and participated in XLII
 Jim Looney – NFL linebacker of the San Francisco 49ers
 Marc May – NFL tight end of the Minnesota Vikings
 Raheem Mostert – NFL running back for the San Francisco 49ers
 Wave Myers – former coach at Ball State
 Mike Neal – NFL defensive tackle of the Green Bay Packers
 Rob Ninkovich – linebacker for the New England Patriots; has also played for the New Orleans Saints and the Miami Dolphins
 Kyle Orton – quarterback, drafted by the Chicago Bears had played for several NFL teams.
 Curtis Painter – backup quarterback for the Indianapolis Colts, drafted in 2009 to succeed Peyton Manning
 Shaun Phillips – NFL defensive end of the Tennessee Titans
 Mike Phipps – College Football Hall of Fame former NFL Quarterback, Cleveland Browns, Chicago Bears, Heisman Trophy Runner-up
 Bernard Pollard – NFL safety of the Tennessee Titans
 Ed Rate – former NFL blocking back for the Milwaukee Badgers
 Karl Singer – AFL tackle for the Boston Patriots
 Joe Skibinski – former NFL guard for the Cleveland Browns and Green Bay Packers
 Ed Skoronski – NFL player
 Blane Smith – former NFL linebacker for the Green Bay Packers
 Anthony Spencer – NFL linebacker drafted by the Dallas Cowboys in 2007.
 John Standeford – NFL wide receiver of the Detroit Lions, member of the Super Bowl XLI-winning Indianapolis Colts
 Darryl Stingley – former NFL wide receiver with the New England Patriots
 Hank Stram – Pro Football Hall of Fame coach of the Kansas City Chiefs
 Taylor Stubblefield – NCAA Division 1 football career receptions leader, played for the St. Louis Rams
 Kevin Sumlin – Head coach of the Arizona Wildcats
 Michael Terrizzi – played briefly for the San Francisco 49ers
 Calvin Williams – NFL wide receiver of the Philadelphia Eagles; rookie of the year
 Clem Woltman – former NFL tackle for the Philadelphia Eagles
 Rod Woodson – Super Bowl Champion (XXXV) Pro Football Hall of Fame defensive back, 11-time Pro-Bowler (at three different positions) and former NFL cornerback

Other sports
 Stephan Bonnar – appeared on the first season of The Ultimate Fighter, retired professional mixed martial artist, two-time Golden Gloves Champion, UFC Hall of Fame member
 David Boudia – Olympic diver (2008, gold 2012, silver 2016)
 Larry Burton – Olympic runner (1976)
 Keith Carter – Olympic swimmer (silver, 1948)
 Joe Corso – Olympic wrestler (1976)
 Javier Díaz – Olympic swimmer for Mexico (2000, 2004)
 Dick the Bruiser – professional wrestling champion. Real name was William Afflis. Also played in the NFL.
 Amanda Elmore – Olympic rower (gold 2016)
 Ray Ewry – ten-time Olympic champion in track and field (gold, 1900, 1904, 1906, 1908) 
 Jon Fitch – Boilermaker team captain wrestler; professional mixed martial artist, formerly with the Ultimate Fighting Championship
 Cliff Furnas – Olympic runner (1920)
 Ray Gunkel – AAU Champion wrestler, NCAA semifinalist and professional champion.
 Ed Glover – Olympic pole-vaulter (bronze, 1906)
 Matt Hamill (attended) – three-time NCAA Division III National Champion in wrestling, silver and gold medalist of the 2001 Summer Deaflympics; mixed martial artist who fought in the Ultimate Fighting Championship; retired
 Lacey Hearn – Olympic athlete (1904)
 Chris Huffins – Olympic decathlete (1996, 2000)
 Steele Johnson – Olympic diver (silver 2016)
 Pariya Junhasavasdikul – Thai professional golfer who plays on the Asian Tour
 Shiv Kapur – Professional golfer
 Gerald Koh – Olympic swimmer (2000)
 Gyöngyvér Lakos – Olympic swimmer (2000)
 Matt Mitrione – former NFL player and current Heavyweight fighter for Bellator MMA
 Nate Moore – boilermaker team captain wrestler; current MMA competitor, formerly fighting for Strikeforce (mixed martial arts)
 Nedzad Mulabegovic – shot put for Croatia (2012)
 Betty Mullen-Brey – 100-meter butterfly (1956)
 Ryan Newman - 2008 Daytona 500 Champion, 2002 Winston Cup Rookie of the Year
 Coralie O'Connor – swimming (1952)
 Jake O'Brien – Boilermaker wrestler; current MMA fighter, previously the WEC and the UFC
 Ike Olekaibe – Olympic athlete (2000)
 Carol Pence-Taylor – Olympic swimmer (1948)
 Kara Patterson – Javelin (2012)
 Eric Rodwell – professional bridge player
 Joan Rosazza – Olympic swimmer (silver, 1956)
 Chris Schenkel – sportscaster
 Lauren Sesselmann – Women's Soccer for Canada (2012)
 Doug Sharp – Olympic bobsledder (2002)
 Miguel Torres (attended), wrestler; current professional mixed martial arts fighter, former WEC Bantamweight Champion
 Frank Verner – Olympic athlete (1904)
 Fred Wampler – PGA Tour golfer
 Beth Whittall – 100-meter butterfly for Canada (1956)
 Jeanne Wilson-Vaughn – Olympic swimmer (1948)
 Fred Wilt – Olympic runner (1948)

Other alumni
 David A. Bednar – LDS Church Apostle; former President of BYU-Idaho
 Vikram Buddhi – imprisoned for threatening the life of U.S. President George W. Bush
 Theodore M. Burton – LDS Church leader
 Kathy Calvin – chief executive officer, United Nations Foundation
 Russell Mawby – chairman emeritus, W.K. Kellogg Foundation
 Sarah Jo Pender, convicted murderer and prison escapee.
 Eric Justin Toth – fugitive on the FBI Ten Most Wanted list
 Richard Leroy Walters – homeless philanthropist

See also
 List of Purdue Boilermakers head football coaches

References

+
Purdue University alumni